M.video is the largest Russian consumer electronic retail chain by revenue and the first and the only publicly traded company in its market sector, listed in Moscow Exchange.

Overview 

The company started its operations in 1993 in Moscow. M.video runs 330 stores in 144 Russian cities as well as 38 on-line internet stores.

History

2012 
M.video sales increased by almost 20% to 158 billion Russian rubles (RUB), including VAT in FY 2012. Growth in revenue was mainly driven by M.video's opening of 42 stores, 9.3% increase in like-for-like stores sales including a 60% increase in online sales. The Group's gross profit increased by 20% to 33 billion RUB in 2012 (27.5 billion RUB in 2011) or as a % of revenue reached 24.7% (24.6% in 2011).

2013 
M.video opened 40 new stores in 2013 (17 new stores in Q4 2013), while closing 3 stores. The total number of the Company's outlets reached 333 stores as of 31 December 2013 located in 144 cities of Russia. The selling space of M.video stores amounted to 582,500 sq. m, while the total space amounted to 785,000 sq. m as of 31 December 2013, demonstrating an 8.5% increase compared to FY 2012 results.

References

External links 

 
 Investor english site

Retail companies of Russia
Companies listed on the Moscow Exchange
Russian brands
Retail companies established in 1993
1993 establishments in Russia
Companies based in Moscow